Countess Alexandra (Sasha) Lvovna Tolstaya (18 June 1884 – 26 September 1979), often anglicized to Tolstoy, was the youngest daughter and secretary of the noted Russian novelist Leo Tolstoy.

Biography 
The youngest daughter of Leo Tolstoy (1828–1910) and of his wife Sophia (1844–1919), Alexandra was close to her father. In 1901, at the age of seventeen, she became his secretary. He appointed her as executor of his will, a task she had to undertake in 1910. Although Alexandra shared her father's belief in non-violence, she felt it was her duty to take part in the events of the First World War and served as a nurse on the Turkish and German fronts. This led to her being gassed and admitted to hospital herself. After the war, she worked on an edition of her father's writings. However, after allowing White Russians to meet in her Moscow home, she was arrested five times by the Bolsheviks and in 1920 was sent to prison for a year.

In 1921 she became the director of the Tolstoy museum at Yasnaya Polyana. She was given permission to leave the Soviet Union in 1929 and went to Japan in the same year. Originally given permission to stay for six months to study schools, she ultimately stayed in the country for 18 months. She worked as a lecturer on Tolstoy and as a Russian teacher, and was supported by Japanese literary and academic circles.

In 1931 she left Japan and settled in the United States, where she gave lectures and worked as a chicken farmer. Some years into this life, she was visited by Tatiana Schaufuss, an old friend who had spent several years in prison and in exile in Siberia. Together, in 1939 they founded the Tolstoy Foundation. 

In 1934, she authored a book about her life entitled "I Worked for the Soviet" and it was published by Yale University Press. The book details the difficulties she faced living in Russia during and after the revolution. 

Tolstaya became a naturalized U.S. citizen in 1941, abandoning the use of the title of countess.

In the summer of 1948, Tolstaya met 18 year old future United States Senator Mike Gravel, who had intended to volunteer for the Israeli forces in a fight to defend the state of Israel,  and she allegedly told him to instead "go on back home and finish school", to which he complied.

In 1974, at the age of ninety, Tolstaya received birthday greetings from President of the United States Richard Nixon, Alexander Solzhenitsyn, and others, and was interviewed by The New York Times. Her father having been excommunicated from the Russian Orthodox Church for his teachings, she commented:

References

Sources 
Rayfield, Donald, Stalin and His Hangmen, Random House, 2004, .

External links 

Countess Alexandra Tolstoy interview at YouTube
Oral history interview with Alexandra Tolstoy 1966 on the subject of Soviet Union History - Revolution, 1917-1921
Bio at Tolstoy Foundation web site
Picture of Alexandra Tolstoy in Valley Cottage
The human spirit is free, Alexandra Tolstaya's appearances by Radio Svoboda's microphone. Introduction by Ivan Tolstoy, April 28, 2008.
1970 film from National Archive
Saint Sergius Learning Center founded in association with Tolstoy Foundation in Valley Cottage

1884 births
1979 deaths
Burials at Novo-Diveevo Russian Cemetery
Russian colonels
Countesses of the Russian Empire
Leo Tolstoy
Russian anti-communists
Russian women
Russian women of World War I
Alexandra
Tolstoyans
Naturalized citizens of the United States
White Russian emigrants to the United States
Women in the Russian and Soviet military
Russian Orthodox Christians from Russia
Russian people of German descent